The Belgian State Railways Type 32 was a class of  steam locomotives for mixed service, introduced in 1902.

Construction history
In total, 502 Type 32 locomotives were built by various manufacturers from 1902 to 1910.

The machines had an inside frame with the cylinders and the Stephenson valve gear also located inside.

From 1905–1913 additionally 307 machines of the Type 32S, a closely related superheated variant, were built. The Type 32S had slightly different dimensions.

References

Bibliography

0-6-0 locomotives
Steam locomotives of Belgium
Standard gauge locomotives of Belgium
C n2 locomotives
Railway locomotives introduced in 1902
Cockerill locomotives
Franco-Belge locomotives
Caledonian Railway locomotives